Patrick Asare (born 14 February 1995) is a Ghanaian footballer who plays as a forward for Kaya–Iloilo in the Philippines Football League.

Early life
Patrick was born in Accra, Ghana where he competed in youth tournaments and was often fielded in matches for higher age groups; Asare was playing for a U-12 team at 8 years old, and for a U-14 team at 9 years old.

Club career

Ghana Division One
Asare played in Ghana's Division One League playing professional football clubs Dreams and later Karela United.

Hiatus in Malaysia
Asare first came to Malaysia in 2014 supposedly to seal a deal that would enable him to play for a reputed club. However he was left stranded in the country without a club after he found out that he was deceived by a fake agent. He was taken in by a local church and Asare decided to continue his studies in Malaysia and pursued a degree in sports management with a focus on football studies. He also went to the United Kingdom in 2016 to finish his studies.

Zwegabin United F.C.

After a two-year hiatus, Asare participated in a tryout organized by Myanmar League 1 club Zwekapin United. which led to him being signed in by the club.

Yadanarbon F.C.
Patrick signed with Yadanarbon in the second quarter of the 2017 Myanmar National League after an impressive short contract spell with Zwekapin United He was also included in squads for the 2017 Myanmar National League. Patrick scored a total of 10 goals in 7 league appearances as well as 2 goals in 2 appearances in the General Aung San Shield for Yadanarbon, making it a total of 12 goals scored in 9 matches played for the team.

Kaya–Iloilo
Philippines Football League side Kaya–Iloilo announced in April 2021 that they have signed in Asare to play for the club.

References

1995 births
Living people
Association football forwards
Myanmar National League players
Expatriate footballers in Myanmar
Ghanaian footballers
Footballers from Accra
Dreams F.C. (Ghana) players
Karela United FC players
Zwegabin United F.C. players
Yadanarbon F.C. players
Shan United F.C. players
Expatriate footballers in Malaysia
Expatriate footballers in the Philippines